The 1986 Italian Open was a men's tennis tournament played on outdoor clay courts at the Foro Italico in Rome in Italy that was part of the 1986 Nabisco Grand Prix. The men's tournament was held from 12 May until 18 May 1986, while the women's tournament was not held this year. First-seeded Ivan Lendl won the singles title.

Finals

Singles
 Ivan Lendl defeated  Emilio Sánchez 7–5, 4–6, 6–1, 6–1
 It was Lendl's 5th singles title of the year and the 58th of his career.

Doubles
 Guy Forget /  Yannick Noah defeated  Mark Edmondson /  Sherwood Stewart 7–6, 6–2

References

External links
 ATP tournament profile

Italian Open
Italian Open
Italian Open (tennis)
Italian Open (Tennis), 1986
Italian Open